Mundlapadu is a village in Krishna district of the Indian state of Andhra Pradesh. It is located in Penuganchiprolu mandal of Vijayawada revenue division.

History 

The village is famous for its great heritage and culture. Sri Ramalingeswara Swami Devalayam temple has 300 years of history. Its presiding deity is Sri Parvathi Sahitha Ramalingeswara Swami, and it was built by the Apotheosis Sree sachidananda swami before his self-entombment.

Demographics 

The total 
population constitute,  males,  females and 
 children, in the age group of 0–6 years. The average literacy rate stands at 
66.92% with  literates, significantly lower than the national average of 73.00%.

Economy 

Agriculture is the main occupation here with major crops being cotton, paddy, chillies, and casurina. Bengalgram and redgram is also grown.
Sunflower is important flower grown in Mundlapadu.

See also 
List of villages in Krishna district

References 

Villages in Krishna district